Schefflera acutissima is a flowering plant in the family Araliaceae. It is endemic to Borneo and Sumatra.

References 

acutissima